Lundquist is a Swedish surname. Notable people with the surname include:

Adam Lundquist, American DJ
Bo Lundquist (born 1942), Swedish businessman
Bryan Lundquist (born 1985), American swimmer
Carl Lundquist (1891-1916), Swedish cyclist
Christoffer Lundquist (born 1970), Swedish musician and producer
David Lundquist (born 1973), American baseball player
Erik Lundquist (1896–1961), Swedish sport shooter
Evert Lundquist (1904–1994), Swedish footballer
Ingemar Lundquist (1921-2007), Swedish-American engineer and inventor
Kurt Lundquist (1925–2011), Swedish sprinter
Lisbet Lundquist (born 1943), Danish film actress
Lynn Lundquist (1934-2013), American politician and businessman
Marianne Lundquist (1931–2020), Swedish swimmer
 Marie Lundquist (born 1950), Swedish author, cultural journalist and translator
Oliver Lincoln Lundquist (1916-2008), American architect
Sadie Lundquist (born 1998), American ice hockey executive
Steve Lundquist (born 1961), American swimmer
 Sven Lundquist (1920-2007), Swedish sport shooter
Verne Lundquist (born 1940), American sports announcer
Vic Lundquist (1908–1938), Canadian hockey player

See also
Lundquist number
Charles H. Lundquist College of Business, University of Oregon
Lundqvist

Swedish-language surnames